Iordanis Konstantinidis (born 5 October 1972) is a Greek wrestler. He competed at the 1992 Summer Olympics and the 1996 Summer Olympics.

References

External links
 

1972 births
Living people
Greek male sport wrestlers
Olympic wrestlers of Greece
Wrestlers at the 1992 Summer Olympics
Wrestlers at the 1996 Summer Olympics
Sportspeople from Ptolemaida